Ole Møller Nielsen (born 26 November 1965) is a retired Danish footballer.

Statistics

References

External links
 

1965 births
Living people
Danish men's footballers
Denmark under-21 international footballers
Danish expatriate men's footballers
Bundesliga players
Vejle Boldklub players
VfL Bochum players
Randers FC players
People from Horsens
Association football midfielders
Association football forwards
Boldklubben 1913 players
Boldklubben 1909 players
Sportspeople from the Central Denmark Region